Culex salinarius, the unbanded saltmarsh mosquito, is a species of mosquito in the family Culicidae.

References

External links

 

salinarius
Articles created by Qbugbot
Insects described in 1904